Breakdown may refer to:

Breaking down
Breakdown (vehicle), failure of a motor vehicle in such a way that it cannot be operated
Chemical decomposition, also called chemical breakdown, the breakdown of a substance into simpler components
Decomposition, the process by which tissues of a dead organism break down into simpler forms of matter
Drop set, also called a breakdown, a bodybuilding and weight training technique
Electrical breakdown, the failure of an electric circuit or a rapid reduction in the resistance of an electrical insulator that can lead to a spark
Mental breakdown, an acute, time-limited phase of exhibiting symptoms of a specific disorder, most commonly, depression and anxiety
Script breakdown, a step in the production of a play, film, or comic book

Arts and media

Comics and games
Breakdown (comics), a 2000s comic written by Chuck Dixon, and drawn by Dave Ross, about Paragon, the world's first superhero
Breakdowns (comics), 1977 collection of comics by Art Spiegelman
Breakdown (Transformers), several fictional nervous and cowardly robot supervillain characters in the Transformers robot superhero franchise
Breakdown (video game), a 2004 first-person action game for the Xbox, noted for unique gameplay mechanics and deeper method of storytelling

Film and television
Breakdown (1952 film), a film noir starring Ann Richards
The Loveless, originally titled Breakdown, a 1981 outlaw biker film starring Willem Dafoe 
Breakdown (1997 film), a 1997 thriller starring Kurt Russell
Breakdown (2016 film), a 2016 British thriller film
Breakdown: In Your House, a 1998 professional wrestling pay-per-view event
"Breakdown", an episode of The Good Doctor

Music
Breakdown (music), an instrumental or percussion section or interlude during a song
Breakdown (band), a 1980s New York hardcore band

Albums
Breakdown (Melissa Etheridge album), a 1999 Melissa Etheridge album
Breakdown (Old & In the Way album), a 1997 bluegrass album by Old and in the Way
Breakdown (Paulinho da Costa album), a 1987 fusion studio album by Paulinho da Costa
Break Down (EP), a 2011 mini album by South Korean Kim Hyun Joong of SS501
Break Down (album), a 2013 album by South Korean boy band Super Junior M

Songs
"Breakdown" (Tom Petty and the Heartbreakers song), 1977 (later covered by Grace Jones)
"Breakdown" (Fu-Schnickens song), 1994
"Breakdown" (Group 1 Crew song), 2010
"Breakdown" (Jack Johnson song), 2005
"Breakdown" (Mariah Carey song), 1998
"Breakdown" (Seether song), 2008
"Breakdown" (Tantric song), 2001
"Breakdown" (Clock DVA song), 1983
"Breakdown" (Queensrÿche song), 1999
"Breakdown," by The Alan Parsons Project from the album I Robot
"Breakdown", by Black Gold
"Breakdown", by Breaking Benjamin from the album We Are Not Alone
"Breakdown", by Daughtry from the album Daughtry
"Breakdown", by Gravity Kills from the album Superstarved
"Breakdown", by Guns N' Roses from the album Use Your Illusion II
"Breakdown", by J. Cole from the album Cole World: The Sideline Story
"Breakdown", by Meg & Dia from the album Cocoon
"Breakdown", by Parliament
"Breakdown", by Relient K from the album The Anatomy of the Tongue in Cheek
"Breakdown", by Ryan Adams from the album Prisoner
"Breakdown", by Suede from the album Suede
Breakdown by G-Easy featuring Demi Lovato from the album These Things Happen Too

Other media
Breakdown: How America's Intelligence Failures Led to September 11, a book by Bill Gertz
Breakdown, a 2016 novel by Jonathan Kellerman in the Alex Delaware series

Break Down (Landy artwork), a 2001 artwork by Michael Landy
The Breakdown, a controversial 1926 painting about the Jazz Age
The Breakdown, a 2017 novel by B.A. Paris

Other uses 
Breakdown (rugby union), the period of open play immediately after a tackle and before and during the ensuing ruck in Rugby Union
Lance Hoyt (born 1977), American professional wrestler who previously used the ring name Breakdown

See also

Broken Down (disambiguation)
Breaking Down (disambiguation)
Breaking Dawn (disambiguation)